Hayley Carmichael is an English actress and theatre-director. She is co-founder of Told by an Idiot and has both devised and performed in almost all their productions. She won the TMA and Time Out awards in 1999 for Best Actress for her performances in I Weep At My Piano, Mr Puntilla and The Dispute.

Education
Carmichael attended Middlesex Polytechnic, and graduated in 1993.

Career
In 1995, Carmichael appeared in a stage adaptation of Emir Kusturica's Time of the Gypsies. Later, Carmichael spoke of her frustration with the production,"we would work four scenes, then not know where to go, and we kept getting to dead ends and buggering off to the pub, thinking, 'what do we do now?'"
The same year, Carmichael played the part of Lovely, a kidnapped prostitute in I'm So Big; a play where two Romani brothers kidnap a prostitute and chain her up in a caravan so that they can buy pizza. The production suffered from protracted exposition at the expense of plot, comedy or character.
In the latter half of the 90s, Carmichael played an upper class girl besotted with her chauffeur in The Right Size' production Kathryn Hunter's Mr Puntila and his Man Matti. Following The Right Size production, Carmichael performed I Weep at my piano with her theatre troupe as part of the London International Mime Festival.

In 2016, Carmichael played Alice in Agatha Christie's The Witness for the Prosecution.

Appearances

Theatre work
"Here Be Lions" 
(French text by Stéphane Olry/La Revue Eclair Paris, English translation by Neil Bartlett). Theatre of Europe - The Print Room at the Coronet - London 2015

For Told by an Idiot
 I'm A Fool To Want You
 Playing The Victim
 The Firework-Maker's Daughter
 A Little Fantasy
 Aladdin
 Shoot Me In The Heart
 Happy Birthday Mister Deka D
 I Weep At My Piano
 Casanova (2007)

Other work
 The Dispute (RSC)
 Mr Puntilla and his Man Matti (The Right Size/Almeida co-production)
 The Maids (2007, Brighton Festival)
 Cymbeline (2006, RSC/ Kneehigh Theatre)
 Theatre of Blood (Royal National Theatre)
 Bliss (2008, Royal Court Theatre)
 The Birds (Royal National Theatre)
 The Street of Crocodiles (Complicite)
 The New Tenant (Young Vic)
 King Lear (Young Vic)
 Mother Courage and Her Children (Shared Experience)
 A Servant to Two Masters (Sheffield Crucible)
 Gormenghast (David Glass Ensemble)
 David Copperfield (Dundee Rep)
 Metamorphosis (Dundee Rep)
 LoserFilm work
 National Achievement Day (1995)
 Simon Magus (1999)
 Anazapta (2001)
 One Day (2007)
 Tale of Tales (2015)

Television work
 Viva Blackpool (2006)
 Tunnel of Love Little Robots The Emperor's New Clothes The Bill The Many Cinderellas Life's A Bitch (aka Life's a Bitch and So Am I)
 Our Zoo (2014)
 The Witness for the Prosecution (Alice Mayhew, 2016)

References

External links
 
 Told by an Idiot

English stage actresses
English television actresses
English film actresses
English Shakespearean actresses
Royal Shakespeare Company members
English theatre directors
Year of birth missing (living people)
Living people